The Willi Busch Report is a 1979 German drama film directed by Niklaus Schilling. It competed in the Un Certain Regard section at the 1980 Cannes Film Festival.

Cast

 Tilo Prückner - Willi Busch
 Kornelia Boje - Rose-Marie Roth
 Dorothea Moritz - Adelheid Busch
 Karin Frey - Helga
 Jenny Thelen - Aenne
 Hannes Kaetner - Sir Henry
 Klaus Hoser - Arno Rösler
 Hildegard Friese - Tante
 Wolfgang Grönebaum - Jupp Müller
 Christoph Lindert - Poradzki
 Horst Nowack - Unterhalter
 Karl Sibold - Rektor
 Hans-Jürgen Leuthen - Bürgermeister
 Horst Pasderski - Gerlach
 Elisabeth Bertram - Ehefrau
 Willy Meyer-Fuerst - Ehemann
 Carola Ehrsam - Wunderkind

References

External links

1979 films
1979 comedy-drama films
German comedy-drama films
West German films
1970s German-language films
Films directed by Niklaus Schilling
Films about journalists
1970s German films